The RIT Tigers represented the Rochester Institute of Technology in College Hockey America during the 2012-13 NCAA Division I women's ice hockey season. This was the inaugural year at the Division I level. The Tigers had been the Division III National Champions in 2011-12, with a 28-1-1 record. In their move to Division I, and the College Hockey America conference, RIT had a modestly successful season, and reached the Semifinal level of the CHA Tournament.

Recruiting

Roster

2012–13 Tigers

Schedule

|-
!colspan=12 style=""| Regular Season

|-
!colspan=12 style=""| CHA Tournament

|-

Awards and honors

Assistant captain Forward Tenicia Hiller was named to the All-CHA Second Team.

References

RIT
RIT Tigers women's ice hockey seasons
Sports in Rochester, New York